Catherine Alexander may refer to:

Catherine Tresa Alexander (born 1989), Indian actress
Catherine Alexander Duer, (1755–1826), American socialite
Catherine Alexander, character in The Other Side of Midnight
Catherine Alexander (botanist) (1863–1928), New Zealand botanist

See also 
Katharine Alexander (1898–1981), American actress